Jan Morcha is an Indian Hindi-language daily newspaper.

Jan Morcha is the most read in Ayodhya, Lucknow,, Sultanpur, Ambedkar Nagar, Jaunpur, Gonda, Basti, Bharaich, Baraeily, Sitapur Pratapgarh, Faizabad, Balrampur, Lakhimpur Kiri, Hardoi, Sant kabir Nagar, Devaria Raibaraeily. The newspaper is owned by Jan India.It is written in clean language broadsheet type paper having a digital format epaper available online.The Ambedkar Nagar edition is managed by Abbas Husain headed in Akbarpur Tehsil of District.

History

The news paper was launched in 1958 in Faizabad during the local municipality election as a weekly bulletin and then after brought as a daily news paper. Mahatma Hargovind, a freedom fighter, was its founder who went multiple times to jails before and after independence.Last 50 years it was run by Sheetla Singh(as editor).
It is Publishing from Ayodhya,Lucknow and Bareily
Janmorcha is running on cooperative base till 1958.
In India it is only cooperative base newspaper which is running successfully

References

External links 

Hindi-language newspapers
Daily newspapers published in India
Mass media in Faizabad
Newspapers published in Uttar Pradesh